Ploskovice is a municipality and village in Litoměřice District in the Ústí nad Labem Region of the Czech Republic. It has about 500 inhabitants.

Administrative parts
Villages of Maškovice, Starý Mlýnec, Těchobuzice and Vinné are administrative parts of Ploskovice.

Geography

History
The first written mention of Ploskovice is in a foundation deed of the Litoměřice Chapter from 1057. In 1188, the village was owned by the nobleman Hroznata of Ovenec, who donated it to the Knights Hospitaller. They had here a commandery until the Hussite Wars. In 1436, King Sigismund handed over Ploskovice to Jakoubek of Vřesovice. He and his descendants fortified the formed commandery and made it an aristocratic residence.

After the uprising of the serfs in 1496, the village fell into the hands of the knight Dalibor of Kozojedy, but he was executed soon after. Dalibor's fate inspired Bedřich Smetana to write the opera Dalibor. In the 16th century, Ploskovice often changed owners. In 1545–1575, the original manor house was rebuilt into a castle. During the Thirty Years' War, Ploskovice was burned several times.

In 1663, Ploskovice was acquired by Dukes of Saxe-Lauenburg. After the death of Duke Julius Francis, Ploskovice was ruled by Duchess Anna Maria Franziska. She had demolish the old castle and had built a new one in 1720–1725. The next owner of Ploskovice was Maximilian III Joseph, Elector of Bavaria. His properties in Bohemia were handed over to Ferdinand III, Grand Duke of Tuscany in 1813, who had expanded the castle. In 1835, Ploskovice became the property of Ferdinand I of Austria. Ploskovice developed after 1848, when the castle became Ferdinand's summer residence.

Sights
Ploskovice Castle is the most important landmark. The Baroque castle was rebuilt to its current appearance in 1850–1853. The interior was decorated by the painter Josef Matěj Navrátil in the Rococo Revival style. The castle has been a tourist destination since 1945 and offers sightseeing tours. Next to the castle is a castle park with a pond, fountains, and rare plants.

References

External links

Villages in Litoměřice District
Ferdinand I of Austria